Gramley is a surname. Notable people with the surname include:

Joseph Gramley (born 1970), American composer
Lyle Gramley (1927–2015), American economist